The 1908–09 season was Chelsea Football Club's fourth competitive season and fourth year in existence.

Table

References

External links
 Chelsea 1908–09 season at stamford-bridge.com

1908–09
English football clubs 1908–09 season